Journey Begins is the debut studio album by British-Bangladeshi singer Mumzy Stranger, released on 12 December 2010 by Tiffin Beats Records.

Background
Journey Begins features a mix of dancehall, reggae, bashment, hip hop and R&B and consists of tracks produced by Mumzy Stranger, Rishi Rich and Steel Banglez. The album also features a collaboration with Wiley.

Singles
The first single from Journey Begins  is "One More Dance". It topped the UK Asian Charts and was the first mainstream music single released by an artist of Bangladeshi descent. The second single "Fly with Me" debuted at number 15 on the UK Asian Download Chart and stayed in the top 40 for more than 17 weeks but dropped off the chart at week 18. There are several remixes of "Fly with Me", a Grime Mix featuring Flo Dan, Gods Gift, KID & Roly; a Rishi Rich Kulcha Mix and a Bangla Mix featuring SH8S. Stranger's fourth and final single from the album is "Spaceman" featuring Wiley.

Promotion
Journey Begins was released on 12 December 2010 by Tiffin Beats Records. Stranger performed songs from the album with a live orchestra to 600 fans and media at a one-off concert on 18 December at Stratford Circus in Stratford, London.

Critical response

DesiHits rated Journey Begins 3/5 and commented, "Despite high expectations and many memorable collaborations and features, "Journey Begins" doesn't impress us. But we know how what a great singer Mumzy Stranger is and we are hoping he snatches them awards."

Track listing

Awards and nominations

References

2010 debut albums
Mumzy Stranger albums
Albums produced by Rishi Rich
Albums produced by Steel Banglez